Lampeter Town  Rugby Football Club is a rugby union team from the town of Lampeter, West Wales. The club is a member of the Welsh Rugby Union and is a feeder club for the Llanelli Scarlets.

Lampeter is believed to be the first town in Wales to field a rugby union team when in 1850 the Reverend Professor Rowland Williams brought the game with him from Cambridge to St. David's College, Lampeter.  Although no evidence exists of the origination of Lampeter RFC as a separate club team from Lampeter College there is written proof of a match in the Western Mail between the college team and a Lampeter club in 1879. In 1881 the Carmarthen Journal reported representatives from Lampeter were present at the formation of the Welsh Rugby Union.

Lampeter have now spent a number of seasons in Division Three West of the WRU league structure, finishing 8th in 2009-2010.

2008/2009 season
Coach Huw Williams guided the club to the final of WRU Swalec Bowl which was played at the Millennium Stadium. The club narrowly lost the final to Morriston RFC.

2009/2010 season
The club experience a tough season following the previous years outing to Cardiff. They ended the season in 8th position after defeating Haverfordwest RFC on the last day of the season to ensure survival.

2010/2011 season
A number of changes took place during the summer. Jonathan Evans took over the head coach role with Huw Williams joining local side Aberaeron. The captaincy was also awarded to long-time player Huw Thomas, taking over from Gary Davies. A number of young players joined the senior squad along with one or two from outside the club.

Lampeter Saints
Lampeter Saints is the name of the club's senior 2nd XV. They play their rugby in West Wales Sport Division 1 West. They often compete against many local sides who also play their 1st XV rugby in Division Three West.

Committee
The club's current Chairman is Mark Jenkins and he is assisted by Club Secretary Gary Davies.

Junior Section
The club have a junior section with players and teams ranging from Under 8's to Under 16's and Youth level. There are many of the current senior squad who have developed their rugby skills within the club's junior ranks.

Notable former player
 John Strand-Jones

References

External links
 Lampeter Town RFC Official club site.
 Lampeter Town RFC Official Club History.

Rugby clubs established in 1875
Welsh rugby union teams
Sport in Ceredigion
1875 establishments in Wales
Lampeter